Biocyclone Cave is a cave in Gunung Buda National Park, Sarawak, Malaysia. It was first explored and surveyed by an American expedition in 1995.

References
 

Caves of Sarawak